Penelope Scambly Schott is a feminist poet and former professor of English at Raritan Valley Community College and Rutgers University.  She has published several books of poetry and has taught poetry writing for Thomas Edison State College.

At Educational Testing Service in the 1980s she was part of the Guidance Research Group, which developed the SIGI PLUS career information system. Schott is a recipient of the 2004 Turning Point Poetry Prize, the Orphic Prize, and a fellowship from the New Jersey State Council on the Arts. She now resides in Portland, Oregon.  She received the 2008 Oregon Book Award in poetry for "A Is for Anne: Mistress Hutchinson Disturbs the Commonwealth".

Publications

 Imitatio Redux, Penelope Schott Starkey, College Composition and Communication, Vol. 25, No. 5 (Dec., 1974), pp. 435–437
 My grandparents were married for sixty-five years, Dept. of English, Fairleigh Dickinson University (1977), 
 A Little Ignorance, Clarkson N. Potter, Inc. (1986), ASIN: B000H5764G
 The Perfect Mother: Snake Nation Press, Incorporated (January 1994), 
 Penelope: The Story of the Half-Scalped Woman : A Narrative Poem, University Press of Florida (December 1998), 
 Almost Learning to Live in This World, published by Pudding House Press (2004)
 The Pest Maiden: A Story Of Lobotomy, WordTech Communications (December 31, 2004), 
 Baiting the Void, Dream Horse Press (September 30, 2005), 
 A is for Anne: Mistress Hutchinson Disturbs the Commonwealth, Turning Point (2007), 
 Six Lips, Mayapple Press (2010), 
 Crow Mercies, CALYX Books (2010), 
 Lillie Was a Goddess, Lillie Was a Whore, Mayapple Press (2013)

See also

Raritan Valley Community College
Rutgers University
New Jersey State Council on the Arts
Educational Testing Service
Poetry
Feminism
Mayapple Press
CALYX, Inc.

External links
The Pest Maiden: A Story of Lobotomy, Poems by Penelope Scambly Schott at turning point books.
Penelope Scambly Schott on Amazon.com
History of Cerridwen Salon
SIGI PLUS

Year of birth missing (living people)
Living people
American feminist writers
American women poets
American modernist poets
Modernist women writers
American academics of English literature
Writers from Portland, Oregon
Rutgers University faculty
Thomas Edison State University faculty
American women non-fiction writers
American women academics
21st-century American women